Diversity gain is the increase in signal-to-interference ratio due to some diversity scheme, or how much the transmission power can be reduced when a diversity scheme is introduced, without a performance loss. Diversity gain is usually expressed in decibels, and sometimes as a power ratio. An example is soft handoff gain. For selection combining N signals are received, and the strongest signal is selected.  When the N signals are independent and Rayleigh distributed, the expected diversity gain has been shown to be , expressed as a power ratio.

See also
 Array gain
 Diversity combining

References

Radio resource management